Altamont (previously known as Altamont Hill or Altamont Park) is an unincorporated community in Steubenville Township, Jefferson County, Ohio, United States.

History
The community was originally laid out in 23 lots on top of a local hill, the name "Altamont Hill" dating back to before the Civil War. In 1899, the Steubenville, Mingo & Ohio Valley Traction Company (later the Steubenville & Wheeling Traction Company) built an electric street railroad from Steubenville to Brilliant and Mingo Junction going over Altamont Hill (with a station in the Atlamont community).  The Altamont line was rarely used though, due to the high grade, and after seven years was abandoned in favor of a lower grade junction that was built around the hill.

References

Unincorporated communities in Jefferson County, Ohio